Peat Inn is a hamlet in Fife, Scotland, around  southeast of Cupar on the B940 and  southwest of St Andrews, in the Riggin o Fife. The hamlet is centred on a hotel and restaurant of the same name.

External links 

its entry in the Gazetteer for Scotland

Hamlets in Fife